Sally Scott Murray (30 October 1775 – 9 May 1854) was the first lady of Maryland.

Early life 
Sally Scott Murray was born in 1775 .
She was the daughter of James and Sarah Maynadier Murray of Annapolis, Maryland.

Career 

On November 30, 1797, she married Edward Lloyd, who became governor of Maryland in 1809. The lived at Chase House, in Anapolis, and Wye Plantation.

She died on  9 May 1854, and is buried at Wye house.

Legacy 
She and her sister,  Anna Maria Murray, were portrayed by Daniel Lloyd, an Irish physician, who was exiled during the American Revolution. The painting is in the Colonial Williamsburg collection.

References

External links
 https://famouskin.com/family-group.php?name=78185

Created via preloaddraft
1775 births
1854 deaths
First Ladies and Gentlemen of Maryland